The 1974 Tulsa Golden Hurricane football team represented the University of Tulsa during the 1974 NCAA Division I football season. In their third year under head coach F. A. Dry, the Golden Hurricane compiled an 8–3 record, 6–0 against Missouri Valley Conference opponents, and won the conference championship.

The team's statistical leaders included Jeb Blount with 1,831 passing yards, Thomas Bailey with 456 rushing yards, and Steve Largent with 884 receiving yards. Largent went on to play 14 years in the National Football League and was inducted into the Pro Football Hall of Fame.

Schedule

Roster

References

Tulsa
Tulsa Golden Hurricane football seasons
Missouri Valley Conference football champion seasons
Tulsa Golden Hurricane football